This is the list of theatrical feature films founded in 1962 owned by Regal Entertainment.

1970s
 Kayod Sa Umaga, Kayod Sa Gabi (1974)
 Ang Nobya Kong Sexy (1975, co-production with Lea Productions)

1976

 Pang Umaga, Pang Tanghali, Pang Gabi (1977)
 Wow, Sikat! Pare, Bigat! (1977)
 Beerhouse (1977)
 Panakip Butas (1977)
 Disco Baby (1977)
 Sugar Daddy (1977, co-production with Sampaguita Pictures)
 Hamog (1978)
 Iwasan... Kabaret (1978)
 Kambal Dragon (1978; released under the Good Harvest Unlimited Inc. label, co-production with Archer Films)
 Facundo Alitaftaf (1978)
 Mahal Mo, Mahal Ko (1978)
 Lagi na Lamang ba Akong Babae? (1978)
 Boy Apache (1978)

1979

1980s

1980

1981
 Blue Jeans
 Totoo Ba ang Tsismis?
 Oh, My Mama!
 Bata Pa si Sabel
 I Confess
 Pabling
 Bilibid Gays (produced under the Good Harvest Unlimited Inc. label)
 Bakit Ba Ganyan?
 Hello, Young Lovers (co-production with Lea Productions)
 Hulihin si Pepeng Magtanggol (produced under the Good Harvest Unlimited Inc. label)
 Summer Love
 Kasalanan Ba?
 Mag-Toning Muna Tayo (produced under the Good Harvest Unlimited Inc. label)
 Caught in the Act

1982

1983
 Strangers in Paradise
 Warren Balane (released under the Good Harvest Unlimited Inc. label)
 To Mama with Love
 Babae, Ikaw Ba'y Makasalanan?
 Pepe en Pilar
 Shame
 Mortal Sin
 Summer Holiday
 Broken Marriage
 Don't Cry for Me, Papa
 Minsan May Isang Ina

1984

1985

1986

1987

1988

1989

1990s

1990

1991

1992

1993

1994

1995

1996

1997

1998

1999

2000s

2000

2001

2002

2003

2004

2005

2006

2007

2008

2009

2010s

2010

2011

2012

2013

2014

2015

2016

2017

2018

2019

2020s

2020

2021

Upcoming films

References

Regal Entertainment films